The Muradiye Mosque is a 15th-century Ottoman mosque in Edirne, Turkey. The building is noted for the tiles that decorate the mihrab and the walls of the prayer hall.

Construction and architecture
The small mosque was commissioned by Murad II and completed in 1435-6. It originally formed part of a Mevlevi dervish complex but was later converted into a mosque. The complex included a soup kitchen (imaret) and an elementary school (mekteb) but these buildings have not survived.
The mosque has a T-shaped plan with a five bay portico and an entrance hall with a domed room on either side. The prayer hall is separated from the entrance hall by a solid arch. The building has been heavily repaired after suffering earthquake damage. The single stone minaret has been rebuilt several times; the present structure dates from 1957.

Tiles

Frieze
The prayer hall has a tiled frieze around three walls and a large tiled mihrab set between two windows. The frieze is formed of eight rows of blue-and-white hexagonal tiles that are set on their points. Some of the tiles were stolen in 2001 and the gaps have been filled with plaster. The tiles have a creamy white fritware body and cobalt blue designs under a clear transparent glaze. The very varied designs are arranged haphazardly. Most show the influence of Chinese blue-and-white porcelain produced in the early 14th century during the Yuan dynasty. Before the theft in 2001 there were 479 tiles with 53 different designs. Of these, 15 designs occurred only once while the most common design occurred 54 times. Filling the gaps between the hexagonal tiles are plain turquoise glazed triangles. The borders of the frieze are formed by a row of rectangular tiles. Along the top of the frieze are a series of large blue-and-white moulded palmette tiles.

Mihrab
 
The exceptionally large rectangular mihrab is formed of moulded polychrome tiles. A tiled inscription on the outer cavetto moulding runs up one side, across the top and down the other side of the mihrab. The cuerda seca cavetto tiles have raised white naskh characters which contrast with the cobalt blue background. Running through the shafts of the naskh characters is a second inscription in yellow Kufic characters. Some of the text on the left side is simply a mirror image of that on the right. The inscriptions include text from the Quran (3:32 - 3:35) and a dedication to Sultan Murad II who ruled between 1421-1444 and again from 1446-1451.

The spandrels of the niche consist of elaborate cuerda sec tiles that are decorated  with yellow, apple green, turquoise, mauve and cobalt blue glazes. In contrast, the stalactite vault of the niche is formed by white moulded tiles with an underglaze floral decoration in cobalt blue. Some of the floral chinoiserie designs on these tiles repeat those used on the hexagonal blue-and-white tiles of the frieze.

Masters of Tabriz
The style of the polychrome cuerda seca tilework of the mihrab is strikingly similar to that of the mihrab in the Yeşil Mosque (built 1419-21) in Bursa and it is therefore considered likely that the tiles were produced by the same team of craftsmen. In Bursa the craftsmen signed the mihrab as "the work of the masters of Tabriz". After completing the tiles of the Muradiye mosque it is believed that the "Masters of Tabriz" also produced the underglaze painted lunette panels of the Üç Şerefeli Mosque (completed in 1447) in Edirne. The blue-and-white hexagonal tiles of the Muradiye Mosque are the earliest example of underglaze painted tiles produced in Ottoman Turkey. They are also the first example of tiles with a frit body produced under the Ottomans.

Tile transfer
Although the walls of the mosque above the tiled frieze are now whitewashed, some of the original painted wall-decoration has been preserved. From the surviving patches of paintwork it is evident that at some point the walls were redecorated with a different design. Strikingly, the tilework appears to have been placed on the walls after the second layer of wall-painting had been applied. This can be clearly seen where the painting runs behind the blue-and-white palmette tiles of the frieze. The art historian John Carswell has argued that although the date of 1435-6 above the entrance fits with the dedication to Murad II on the mihrab, it is probable that the tiles were transferred to the mosque from an imperial building. As supporting evidence he points to the lack of a coherent pattern to the arrangement of hexagonal tiles and the mixing of the two different styles of rectangular border tiles. The mihrab is also unusually large for the size of the building. Carswell suggests that it is likely that the tiles were original made for a building in the palace complex on the plain below. In 1450 Murad II built a palace complex, the Saray-ı Cedid-i Amire (New Imperial Palace), to the north of the city on an island in the river Tunca. The palace was expanded by successive sultans and in the 17th century accommodated between six and ten thousand people. By the early 19th century much of the palace was in ruinous state and almost nothing now survives.

Notes

References

Sources

External links
YouTube video, Edirne Chamber of Commerce
Photographs of Edirne by Dick Osseman. Includes a few pictures of the mosque.

Ottoman mosques in Edirne
Mosques in Edirne
Tourist attractions in Edirne
Ottoman architecture in Edirne
Religious buildings and structures completed in 1436
15th-century mosques